Hazardville is a section of the town of Enfield, Connecticut, in Hartford County. It is a census-designated place (CDP) that had a total population of 4,599 as of the 2010 census.

History

Hazardville originated as an industrial village centered around the manufacture of gunpowder using water power from the Scantic River. The first small black powder mill was established in 1835 by Allen Loomis in an area then known as Powder Hollow. This became the Hazard Powder Company.

Hazardville takes its name from Colonel Augustus George Hazard.

Historic district

A  area in and near Hazardville was listed on the National Register of Historic Places in 1980 as the Hazardville Historic District. The district is an irregularly shaped area that surrounds two interior areas that are not historical and are not included in the district.  The district is focused on resources associated with the powder works, and includes industrial archaeological resources on either side of the Scantic River.

Geography
The Hazardville CDP includes, in addition to the original Hazardville village, newer suburban developments east of the Central New England Railroad line to the Somers town line.

One parcel of the Scantic River State Park is in the Powder Hollow portion of Hazardville.

Demographics
As of the census of 2000, there were 4,900 people, 1,832 households, and 1,337 families residing in the CDP.  The population density was 575.0/km2 (1,487.6/mi2).  There were 1,876 housing units at an average density of 220.2/km2 (569.6/mi2).  The racial makeup of the CDP was 95.45% White, 1.41% African American, 0.22% Native American, 1.41% Asian, 0.02% Pacific Islander, 0.45% from other races, and 1.04% from two or more races.  1.41% of the population were Hispanic or Latino of any race.

There were 1,832 households, out of which 32.4% had children under the age of 18 living with them, 59.4% were married couples living together, 9.1% had a female householder with no husband present, and 27.0% were non-families. 22.3% of all households were made up of individuals, and 10.6% had someone living alone who was 65 years of age or older.  The average household size was 2.61 and the average family size was 3.07.

In the CDP, the population was spread out, with 24.3% under the age of 18, 5.4% from 18 to 24, 30.4% from 25 to 44, 21.8% from 45 to 64, and 18.1% who were 65 years of age or older.  The median age was 40 years. For every 100 females, there were 94.5 males.  For every 100 females age 18 and over, there were 93.2 males.

The median income for a household in the CDP was $54,596, and the median income for a family was $61,183. Males had a median income of $40,606 versus $28,806 for females. The per capita income for the CDP was $22,293.  3.7% of the population and 2.1% of families were below the poverty line.   2.1% of those under the age of 18 and 2.1% of those 65 and older were living below the poverty line.

References

Further reading
 Arthur Pine Van Gelder and Hugo Schlatter (1927). History of the Explosives Industry in America. New York: Columbia University Press.

Census-designated places in Hartford County, Connecticut
Neighborhoods in Connecticut
Enfield, Connecticut
Census-designated places in Connecticut
Company towns in Connecticut